Marie-Louise "MaLou" Lindholm (born 18 October 1948) is a Swedish politician born in Stockholm who served as a Green Party member of the European Parliament from 9 October 1995 and 19 July 1999.

In 2003, she was awarded the Swedish Carnegie Institute's journalist prize, together with Torgny Peterson, for "the unveiling of the Mike Trace scandal in the United Nations and for a news service via the Hassela Nordic Network".

In the 2004 European Parliament election in Sweden, she was a cross-political candidate.

References

1948 births
Living people
Green Party (Sweden) MEPs
MEPs for Sweden 1995–1999
20th-century women MEPs for Sweden
Politicians from Stockholm
21st-century Swedish women politicians